Flexiant is a United Kingdom-based software company founded in 2009 that provides software to cloud services providers.

History
In 1997 Flexiant's founder, Tony Lucas, formed a hosting company called XCalibre Communications.  One of Xcalibre's products was Extility, a cloud orchestration software.

In 2007, XCalibre built and launched FlexiScale,  using Extility.  FlexiScale was Europe’s first public cloud platform, released nine months earlier than Amazon's European cloud platform.  This platform consisted of pay-as-you-go virtual dedicated servers that could be set up by customers themselves.

XCalibre, the web hosting business was sold in 2009, and the remaining company was renamed Flexiant.  Flexiant focused on developing software for other service providers in Europe.

In 2010, Flexiant launched the first version of Extility Cloud Orchestration, and by 2011, 95 customers were using the software.

In 2012, Flexiant secured additional funding and expanded their management team.  The Extility software was renamed Flexiant Cloud Orchestrator Version 2.0. Flexiant developed partnerships with companies in Europe and the US, created a test lab in Amsterdam and opened an office in New York. In November 2012 a new version of Flexiant Cloud Orchestrator (Version 3.0) was released. In the same month, the Info-Tech Research Group awarded the Trendsetter Award to Flexiant for the previous version.

In 2013, Flexiant became the Premier Sponsor of Cloud Expo Europe. In May 2013, Flexiant released Flexiant Cloud Orchestrator V3.1, followed by V4.0 in November.

In February 2014, FlexiScale Public Cloud Platform was acquired by FlexiScale Technologies Ltd, located in Nottingham, headed up by CEO Rajinder Basi and CTO Norman Hinds.

In October 2014, Flexiant launched Flexiant Concerto, a multi cloud workload management system.

In June 2016, Flexiant was acquired by FlexiScale Technologies Ltd.

References

External links
 

Software companies of the United Kingdom
Companies based in Nottingham